San Juan De Los Terreros is the easternmost village of Andalucía. The coastal village has several bays and beaches nearby. San Juan de los Terreros is a few miles along the coast south of Aguilas. The area has supermarkets, chemist, restaurants, tapas bars, coffee shops, ice-cream parlours, and a medical centre. It also has a nightclub during the summer months and a garden center. An open market takes place during the summer each Sunday morning. The small coves in San Juan de Los Terreros have traditional fishermen's cottages on the coastline. A volcanic island, cliffs, and coves are located along the coast.

References

Geography of Andalusia